Avaimet mun kulmille is the debut studio album by Finnish rapper Cheek. It was released on 31 May 2004. The album peaked at number 19 on the Official Finnish Album Chart.

Track listing

Charts

Release history

References

2004 albums
Cheek (rapper) albums